The Mountain Club of South Africa (MCSA) is the largest and oldest mountaineering club in South Africa. It facilitates and engages in mountaineering, climbing of all types, bouldering, hiking, international expeditions, mountain search and rescue, training, conservation of mountain areas, and procurement of access for mountaineering.

History
The MCSA was founded in 1891 and hence is one of the oldest mountaineering clubs in the world. Since its establishment, the MCSA has been embedded with and reflected, the political ideology and interests of the social and governing class during the colonial and segregation eras. This situation prevailed for most of the apartheid era, when the club finally opened its membership to all, regardless of race and the first black member was admitted in 1986. The MCSA is the only mountain club in Africa affiliated with the world mountaineering body, the UIAA. Members of the MCSA have climbed and hiked on all the major mountain ranges throughout the world. Since its inception, the MCSA has published an annual journal. The MCSA Journal is one of the oldest mountain club journals still being published on an annual basis.

The club consists of 14 sections spread over South Africa and Namibia and with more than 4000 members. 
Amajuba
Cape Town
Eastern Province
Free State
Hottentots Holland
Johannesburg
KwaZulu-Natal
Magaliesberg (also known as the Pretoria section)
Namibia
Paarl/Wellington
South Cape
Stellenbosch
Tygerberg
Worcester

The objectives of the Mountain Club of South Africa are to further the interests of mountaineering in South Africa and elsewhere, and in doing so inter alia to:
 
 Organise and facilitate mountaineering
 Procure and protect real rights in and access to mountains and mountain areas
 Initiate and support actions towards protecting the natural beauty and wilderness character of mountains and to promote their effective conservation management
 Promote the safety and training of mountaineers
 Provide search and rescue resources
 Promote the study of mountains and their environments, the preservation of historical and archaeological sites on them and the dissemination of information on mountains and mountaineering.

Notable members 
Keppel Harcourt Barnard
Elsie Elizabeth Esterhuysen
Johannes de Villiers Graaff
Rudolf Marloth
Cathy O'Dowd
Edwin Percy Phillips
Marianne Pretorius
Jan Smuts

See also
South African National Climbing Federation

References

External links
The Mountain Club of South Africa
The MCSA - Cape Town Section
Johannesburg Section
Mcsamagalies.co.za
MCSA Eastern Province Section
UIAA website
Kzn.mcsa.org.za

Sports governing bodies in South Africa
Climbing organizations
Hiking organizations
Alpine clubs
Sports organizations established in 1891
Sports clubs in South Africa